Mikael Andreas Dahlberg (born 6 March 1985) is a Swedish former footballer who played as a striker.

Dahlberg began his career in Mariehem SK from Umeå. He moved to GIF Sundsvall in the 2004 season and made his Allsvenskan debut against Örebro SK on July 18, 2004. Dahlberg was capped 61 times, scoring 10 goals before moving to Djurgårdens IF in 2007. During his time in Djurgården, Dahlberg has been capped 34 times, scoring five goals for Djurgården. He has also been capped 21 times, scoring six goals for Sweden's U21 team.

On January 24, 2009 Dahlberg played for the first time for the Sweden national football team against USA at Sweden's "USA-tour". Dahlberg headed in a late goal for Sweden on a pass from Alexander Farnerud in the 3–2 loss against USA.

Career statistics

International 
List of international goals scored by Mikael Dahlberg

References

External links 

1985 births
Umeå FC players
Djurgårdens IF Fotboll players
GIF Sundsvall players
Gefle IF players
Apollon Smyrnis F.C. players
Helsingborgs IF players
Swedish footballers
Swedish expatriate footballers
Sweden youth international footballers
Sweden under-21 international footballers
Sweden international footballers
Association football forwards
Living people
Sportspeople from Umeå
Expatriate footballers in Greece
Allsvenskan players
Super League Greece players
Swedish expatriates in Greece